Captain Barbell (International title: Captain Barbell: The Return) is a 2011 Philippine television drama action fantasy series broadcast by GMA Network. The series is based on a Philippine fictional superhero of the same title by Mars Ravelo. Directed by Dominic Zapata, it stars Richard Gutierrez in the title role. It premiered on March 28, 2011 on the network's Telebabad line up replacing Machete. The series concluded on July 29, 2011 with a total of 88 episodes. It was replaced by Time of My Life in its timeslot.

Cast and characters

Lead cast
 Richard Gutierrez as Potenciano "Teng" Magtanggol / Captain Barbell

Supporting cast
 Jillian Ward as Lelay / Super Tiny
 Lovi Poe as Althea
 Isabel Oli as Melanie Ocampo
 Christopher de Leon as Nero
 Michelle Madrigal as Anita / Cyclone
 Frencheska Farr as Celina / Sonica
 Sam Pinto as Sammy
 Solenn Heussaff as Janna Esquivel
 Ellen Adarna as Katrina "Kat" Lazatin / Fuega
 Jake Vargas as Alden / Spin 
 Bea Binene as Misha / Blade
 Mike Tan as Teban / Anino
 Eddie Gutierrez as Armando Chavez
 TJ Trinidad as Gregor Javier / Metal Man
 Akihiro Sato as Bruno / Higante
 Paolo Paraiso as Rodel / Buhangin
 Ervic Vijandre as Ricky Alejandre / Kidlat
 Jon Hall as Robert
 Stef Prescott as Eva
 Elvis Gutierrez as Gaston / Black Angel

Recurring cast
 Ces Quesada as Liya
 Ryan Yllana as Bobby Santos
 Jaya Ramsey as Dolores Fernandez
 Marky Lopez as Hekki
 Lloyd Samartino as Manuel Javier
 Shamaine Centenera-Buencamino as Evie
 Christine Joy De Guzman as Angelina
 Saab Magalona as Kristel
 Nina Ricci Alagao as Corrinne Lumibao
 Joko Diaz as Bong
 Fayatollah as Wifey
 Jade Lopez as Melanie's officemate
 Jaime Fabregas as President

Guest cast
 Rhian Ramos as Leah Lazaro-Magtanggol
 Jennylyn Mercado as Rose
 Tin Arnaldo as Ofelia Concepcion
 Dino Guevarra as Fernando 
 Jennica Garcia as Linda / Aswang
 Bubbles Paraiso as Aswang
 Lilia Cuntapay as Faustina
 Rox Montealegre as Edith / Aswang
 Maxene Magalona as Dalisay
 Bianca King as Lary Gempez

Ratings
According to AGB Nielsen Philippines' Mega Manila household television ratings, the pilot episode earned a 25% rating. While the final episode also scored a 25% rating.

References

External links
 

Captain Barbell
2011 Philippine television series debuts
2011 Philippine television series endings
Fantaserye and telefantasya
Filipino-language television shows
GMA Network drama series
Philippine action television series
Superhero television series
Television shows based on comics
Television shows set in the Philippines